Hawas may refer to:
 Hawas (1974 film), an Indian Hindi-language drama film
 Hawas (2004 film), an Indian Hindi erotic thriller